Ashwini, Ashvini or Asvini may refer to:
Ashvini, the first nakshatra (lunar mansion) of Hindu astrology
Ashwini (film), a 1991 Telugu film

People 
 Ashwini (actress) (1967–2012), Indian Tamil-Telugu actress
 Ashwini Akkunji (born 1987), Indian athlete
 Ashwini Bhave, Indian actress
 Ashwini Bhat (born 1980), Indian-American ceramic artist
 Ashwini Bhatt (1936–2012), Gujarati language novelist
 Ashwini Bhide-Deshpande (born 1960), Hindustani classical music vocalist
 Ashwini Ekbote (1972–2016), Indian theatre and screen actress and classical dancer
 Ashwini Kalsekar (born 1970), Indian film and television actress
 Ashwini Kapoor (born 1965), Indian cricketer
 Ashwini Kumar Dutta (1856–1923), Bengali educationist, philanthropist, social reformer and patriot
 Ashwini Nachappa (born 1967), Indian athlete and actress
 Ashwini Ponnappa (born 1989), Indian badminton player
 Ashwini Roy Sarkar, Bharatiya Janata Party politician from Assam
 Ashwini Sharma, Bharatiya Janata Party politician from Punjab
 Ashvini Yardi, producer of Bollywood movies

 C. Ashwini Dutt, Telugu film producer

See also 
 
 
 Ashwin (disambiguation)